Sabitha Kumari is the nom de guerre of a squad commander of the Communist Party of India (Maoist) in West Bengal, India.

Early life
According to the West Bengal police Intelligence Bureau, she was born in the Prabira village of Jharkhand and is a science graduate from Daltonganj College.

Political career
Sabitha Kumari joined the Maoists in 2000. She was earlier in charge of the Maoist guerrilla outfit in Dantewada, Chhattisgarh., and she is on the Chhattisgarh most-wanted list and several cases are registered against her, including accusations of killing police officers and political leaders and helping fellow Maoists escape from police lock-up.

References

Indian communists
Living people
People from Sambalpur district
Year of birth missing (living people)